Boa Vista [] (Portuguese for beautiful view ) was a German literary magazine, founded in Hamburg in 1974 and published until 1983.

The magazine came out at irregular intervals and produced ten issues.

Approach and authors
With recourse to Dada, surrealism and the narrative forms of Beat – and Cut-up literature, Boa Vista entirely focused on experimental poetry and prose. Its regular or temporary employees included the following writers and artists :

References

1974 establishments in West Germany
1983 disestablishments in West Germany
Defunct literary magazines published in Germany
German-language magazines
Magazines established in 1974
Magazines disestablished in 1983
Magazines published in Hamburg
Irregularly published magazines published in Germany